Mecas femoralis is a species of longhorn beetles found in the southeastern United States. It was described by Haldeman in 1847.

This species can be identified by its small size (6-8 mm), rather uniform pubescence, lack of pronotal calluses, and reddish femora.

References

Saperdini
Beetles described in 1847